Taiwanotrechus subglobosus is a species of beetle in the family Carabidae, the only species in the genus Taiwanotrechus.

References

Trechinae